The First Templar is an action-adventure video game developed by Haemimont Games and published by Kalypso Media for the Xbox 360 and Microsoft Windows. It was released on both platforms in May 2011 in Europe and North America.

The First Templar follows the story of two characters - French Templar Celian d'Arestide, and his companion, Marie d'Ibelin, a noble lady who has been proclaimed a heretic by the Dominican Inquisition. Taking control over these two unlikely allies, the player must uncover the mysteries behind the Templar Order, play a role in a grand conspiracy, and discover the secret of the Holy Grail. The First Templar features both single player and co-op modes. When playing solo, the player can switch between the two characters, leaving the control of the second hero to the game's AI. At any moment a second player can join in and take control of the AI controlled hero.

Gameplay
The game may be played solo or cooperatively either way Celian is always present with its partner being alternated between Roland and Marie. The three characters may be defined in a traditional action roleplaying game style - much like that of Dungeons and Dragons - as a Fighter (Roland), a Rogue/Assassin (Marie) and a Paladin (Celian).

The main action is about swordplay with attacks and shield - or sword - defenses being central. Minor skills are also in existence some being common to all characters and some being exclusive to one or another. Magic is an absent concept being Celian's prayer ability the only one resembling it. The enemies are also of an unmagic kind.

Plot

Characters
Celian d'Arestide - The player character, Celian is noble, chivalrous knight who fights to preserve his order amid the Inquisition. Unlike many of his contemporaries, Celian received a formal education in addition to his combat training. Due to him falling from a tower in his past, Celian has lost all of his memories prior to adulthood.
Marie d'Ibelin - The granddaughter of Guy d'Ibelin, Marie was raised in Saracen traditions. She joins Celian after being branded a heretic by the Inquisitors. Taught to fight and defend herself at an early age, she utilizes twin daggers in combat.
Roland de Saint-Omer - A senior member of the Templar order who fought alongside Celian in several campaigns in the East. 
 Lady Isabelle - a French messenger sent by Phillip IV, you later find out that she is trying to destroy the templar order and she masks her goals to Celian and his friends.
Wilhelm of Beaujeau - The Grand Master of the Templar Order and Celian's longtime mentor. He is described as a wise leader who is physically robust despite his advanced age.
Phillip IV - The King of France, and one of the primary antagonists. He betrays the Templar Order and allies himself with the Inquisition.
The Byzantine - A secondary antagonist introduced in the Arena DLC pack. He lives in a fortified castle with a large arena, and forces his prisoners to engage in gladiatorial combat.

Story
In 1291 AD, the Crusades are coming to an end. Acre, in Palestine, the last Christian city in the Holy Land is under siege and about to fall into Mamluk hands.

Celian and Roland, two Templar knights have just arrived in Cyprus in order to talk to the Templar Grandmaster seeking advice in their quest for the Holy Grail. Upon their arrival they find out that the island is being attacked by Muslim warriors and hurry the protect it. In doing so they encounter a kidnapped messenger from Guy d'Ibelin who says that her master's daughter - Marie d'Ibelin - is being held prisoner by the Inquisition.

After consulting their Grandmaster the two of them go to an undetermined location in Europe where they discover that the Inquisition - led by a shadowy agent called Isaiah - is plotting something of monumental proportions. They release Marie but Roland is left behind during their escape, henceforth becoming Celian's partner for most of the subsequent game.

Celian and Marie - believing Roland to have been killed - continue their quest for the Grail fighting a great deal of Muslim enemies in the process and helping those in need - even if the idea to help always come from Celian and is criticized by Marie who will remark that they are wasting time. At some point they discover that Guy d'Ibelin is also dead and that the Holy Land is lost for good. They finally find the Holy Grail Temple but learn that it was emptied long ago. In the temple however they find a dying Templar who mistakes Celian for the Grandmaster in a scene that seems very odd at the moment. Running out of options they decide to go to France in order to get some help and advice from the Grandmaster and the main body of the Order.

They arrive in France in 1307, the year when King Philip IV and Pope Clement V start their accusations against the Templar Order. Both the heroes fall into The Inquisition's trap and just when they are about to be imprisoned they find Roland, who has not been killed but instead was tortured and then pledged his allegiance to the anti-Templar movement becoming its Black Knight.

Roland's friendship to Celian though, turns out to be much stronger than his new-found allegiance so he helps his friend to reach an escape port through the woods where Celian is reunited with Marie. From that point on, Roland tells them they are on their own and so they depart for a fortified Templar stronghold where they intend to join forces with the Grandmaster to fight back the French king armies.

The Grandmaster reveals that Celian is in fact Hugues de Payens the founder of the Templar Order. His memory loss was a side effect due to an assassination attempt by the current Grandmaster himself on him because he had hidden the Grail, which was responsible for prolonging the lives of the nine founders of the Order far beyond the natural lifespan of a normal human being. After the deaths of three of the original nine - probably due to internal power struggles - Hugues realized that the Grail was dangerous and so took it and hid it. The Grandmaster - who is himself also one of the original nine - wanted the Grail back so he took advantage from Hugues memory loss and gave him the task of finding the cup in hopes that something inside him would lead him straight to it.

After the plot twist the player realizes that the true enemies are in fact the Templar Order - who become the main antagonist of the game from now on. By remembering his true identity, Celian - or Hugues - also concludes that his castle would be the place where he would hide something he didn't want anyone to ever find.

In the end, the player defeats both the Grandmaster and Isaiah - from the Inquisition - and is given a choice to use the grail or destroy it. This affects only the final narration, describing either immortal guardians or humanity free to make its own decisions.

Reception
The First Templar received "mixed or average reviews" according to review aggregator Metacritic. 

While the combat system, visual style and story received some positive feedback, the dated design and lack of polish drew criticism. Eurogamer described it as "..the good kind of 6/10, the sort of zero-expectation, low-budget game that approaches the score from below...a decent hack-and-slash brawler...Not a great one". GameZone gave the game a 3.5 out of 10, stating "This is a game that you’re going to want to like. You’re going to want it to succeed, but it’ll only let you down. The entire time you’ll be thinking about what they could have done differently and better."

References

External links
 
  at Kalypsomedia.com
  at Haemimont Games
 

2011 video games
Action-adventure games
Cooperative video games
Games for Windows certified games
Hack and slash games
Holy Grail in fiction
Video games set in the Middle Ages
Video games developed in Bulgaria
Video games featuring female protagonists
Video games set in the Crusades
Video games set in Acre, Israel
Video games set in Cyprus
Video games set in France
Video games set in Israel
Windows games
Xbox 360 games
Fiction about death games
Knights Templar in popular culture
Video games set in the 13th century
Video games set in the 14th century